Ulrike Reinhard (born 1960) is a German publisher, author, digital nomad and futurist. She is best known for her skatepark in Madhya Pradesh, Janwaar Castle. Reinhard has also been editor of WE Magazine and has written for Think Quarterly. All her work is related to network theory with the Internet at its core. It's the interactions and co-creation processes within her network she cherishes most. She loves to see things emerging and falling into place.

Biography
Born in Heidelberg in 1960, Reinhard studied business administration at the University of Mannheim. After graduating, she spent over 10 years investigating new media developments in Italy and the United States. Back in Germany, in 1994 she organized a conference on interactive television, accompanied by her publication Interaktives Fernsehen: Kontaktadressen.

Projects

She co-founded DNAdigital, a 2008-2010 initiative in Germany that aimed to foster dialogue between the 'Internet Generation' and business leaders regarding the world of work.

She published and contributed to Reboot_D - Digital Democracy, a 2009 compilation of articles and interviews about the way the internet is shaping and transforming society and politics in Germany.
  
In 2008 Reinhard set up a project called WeBenin, aiming to help people in one of the poorest countries in West Africa to empower themselves, avoiding the paradigm of rich NGOs giving goods to poor aid recipients.

She founded a skatepark in Janwaar in Madhya Pradesh, called Janwaar Castle, where one of the main rules to use the rink is "no school, no skateboarding," and which encourages girls to use the rink. The rink has had a positive effect in helping to encourage girls to be involved in physical activities and has reduced violence between the Adivasi and Yadev castes in the area. Now children from both castes make friends. Young people in the village also learn English, how to paint, create 3D models, learn life skills, music and dance. In 2016, Asha Gond, one of the girls from the village who Reinhard was tutoring in English, was selected to attend school in the United Kingdom. A short film was made about the park, called The Barefoot Skateboarders. The non-profit organization that Reinhard created to run the skatepark is also called Janwaar Castle. In March 2017, she founded the Rural Changemakers of Janwaar.

Public talks 
 TEDx Gurugram, 5 March 2016.
 Harvard Model United Nations India, 13 Aug, 2017.
 TEDx Flanders Women Antwerp, 2 November 2017.

Publications

References

External links
Official site

20th-century German writers
21st-century German writers
German women writers
German bloggers
Living people
1960 births
German women bloggers